Singanallur, Coimbatore, is a major residential neighbourhood in the eastern part of Coimbatore city.

Singanallur may also refer to:

 Singanallur (state assembly constituency)
 Singanallur Bus Terminus
 Singanallur railway station
 Singanallur Lake